The 2008–09 B Group was the 54th season of the Bulgarian B Football Group, the second tier of the Bulgarian football league system. The season started on 16 August 2008 and finished on 17 June 2009 with the A Group promotion play-off between the runners-up from both divisions.

Stadia, Locations and Results

West B Group

Teams Competing
 Etar 1924 Veliko Tarnovo
 Spartak Pleven
 PFC Chavdar Byala Slatina
 Akademik Sofia
 Pirin Gotse Delchev
 Montana
 Belite orli Pleven
 Rilski Sportist Samokov
 Sportist Svoge
 Chavdar Etropole
 Vidima-Rakovski Sevlievo (relegated from A Group)
 Marek Dupnitsa (relegated from A Group)
 Botev Krivodol (winners of North-Western V group)
 Kom-Minyor (runners-up of North-Western V group)
 Balkan Botevgrad (runners-up of South-Western V group)
 Bansko1

 1FC Bansko replaced FC Pirin Blagoevgrad, last season's winners of the South-West group, when it merged with another club from Blagoevgrad, which is playing the A PFG.

Table

East B Group

Teams Competing
 Naftex Burgas
 Maritsa Plovdiv
 Spartak Plovdiv
 Dunav Ruse
 Shumen
 Kaliakra Kavarna
 Svetkavitsa
 Minyor Radnevo
 Nesebar
 Rodopa Smolyan
 Svilengrad
 Beroe Stara Zagora (relegated from A Group)
 Chernomorets Balchik (runners-up of North-Eastern V group)
 Lyubimets 2007 (winners of South-Eastern V group)
 Lokomotiv Stara Zagora (runners-up of South-Eastern V group)

1No second team from North-Eastern V group was promoted because the winners, Dobrudzha Dobrich, and Ariston Ruse, team that should have replaced it, refused to participate and will play in this season's V Group.

Table

Promotion play-off

References

External links
 Soccerway
 RSSSF

Second Professional Football League (Bulgaria) seasons
2008–09 in Bulgarian football
Bulgaria